Andrés Marco Antonio Bernal Gutiérrez (born 30 November 1953) is a Mexican politician affiliated with the PRI. As of 2013 he served as Deputy of both the LX and LXII Legislatures of the Mexican Congress representing Tamaulipas. He also served as Senator during the LVII Legislature.

Zapatista Crisis
On February 9, 1995, Ernesto Zedillo 71-day-old administration ignited a tremendous social crisis. After he announced Subcomandante Marcos to be Rafael Sebastián Guillén Vicente. In counterproductive turn of events, President Ernesto Zedillo made a series of decisions that broke the peaceful solution strategy action plan defined by Carlos Salinas that kept the peace since the Zapatista Army of National Liberation uprising and the agreements Zedillo authorized his Secretary of Interior  Esteban Moctezuma to compromise with Marcos 3 days before in Guadalupe Tepeyac. No matter there was an amnesty law by Salinas and without knowing exactly who Marcos was, only with the PGR single presumption that Marcos was a dangerous guerrilla. » President Ernesto Zedillo decided to launch a military offence to capture or annihilate Marcos in a televised special broadcast President Ernesto Zedillo alleged Marcos to be a terrorist in Nicaragua. There was a storm of political pressures claiming for a fast military solution to the 1995 Zapatista Crisis. » Conflicting signals got strengthened for a fast military solution. Facts seemed to confirm Manuel Camacho Solis June 16, 1994 accusations that the reason for his resignation as the Chiapas Peace Commissioner, was due to sabotage done by then presidential candidate Ernesto Zedillo. Faced with this situation, Rafael Guillén, childhood friend and colleague, at the Jesuits College Instituto Cultural Tampico Max Appedole played a major role with the Mexican government to avoid a Military solution by demonstrating that contrary to the accusations announced by President Ernesto Zedillo, » Rafael Guillén, was no terrorist. He recognized his literary style in all Marcos manifestos that were published in the media, linked them to their literary tournaments organized by the Jesuits in which they competed in Mexico. Confirming that he had no doubt that Marcos was his friend Rafael Guillén, a pacifist. Max Appedole asked for help from Edén Pastora the legendary Nicaraguan "Commander Zero" to prepare a report for under-Secretary of the Interior Luis Maldonado Venegas; the Secretary of the Interior Esteban Moctezuma and the President Ernesto Zedillo about Marcos natural pacifist vocation and the terrible consequences of a tragic outcome.
» The document concluded that the marginalized groups and the radical left that exist in México, have been vented with the Zapatistas movement, while Marcos maintains an open negotiating track. Eliminate Marcos and his social containment work will would cease and the radical groups to take control of the movement. They will response to violence with violence. Terrorist activities would begin. The country would be in a dangerous spiral, which could lead to very serious situations because not only there is discomfort in Chiapas, but in many places in Mexico.» Under a big political pressure of a highly radicalized situation Mexico Luis Maldonado Venegas reestablish the Mexican Government Zapatista Army of National Liberation dialog to search for peace by demonstrating Marcos natural peace vocation and the terrible consequences of a military solution.

Protocol  
By April 9, 1995, the Bases for the Dialog Protocol and the harmony, peace with justice and dignity agreement Negotiation between the Mexican Government and the Zapatistas got signed.

Peace Commissioner in Chiapas  
On April 17, 1995 the Mexican Government appoints Marco Antonio Bernal as Peace Commissioner in Chiapas. the Mexican Government and the Zapatistas Peace Talks started in San Andrés Larráinzar on April 22, 1995. The Zapatistas rejected the Mexican Government  proposal.
Peace Talks Dialog re initiated on Jun 7, 1995 they agree with Alianza Cívica Nacional y the Convención Nacional Democrática to organize a national Consultation for Peace and Democracy. The Bases for the Dialog Protocol was re negotiated, in La Realidad Chiapas. October 12, 1995 Peace Talks Dialog is resumed in San Andres Larráinzar, Chiapas.

References

1953 births
Living people
People from Matamoros, Tamaulipas
Members of the Senate of the Republic (Mexico)
Members of the Chamber of Deputies (Mexico)
Institutional Revolutionary Party politicians
21st-century Mexican politicians